Achiyalabopa was a huge bird god of the Pueblo people. He is described as being of extraordinary size and having rainbow-colored feathers as sharp as knives. It was considered a celestial creature and may have once been attributed to the whole of creation.

References
Godchecker.com entry on Achiyalabopa

Legendary birds
Gods of the indigenous peoples of North America
Pueblo culture
Stellar gods